The Slippery Noodle Inn is a large blues bar and restaurant with two performance stages in downtown Indianapolis, Indiana. It also has the distinction of being the oldest continuously operating bar in the state of Indiana, having opened in 1850 as the Tremont House.

The Inn served as a stop on the Underground Railroad during the American Civil War.  During prohibition it was called a restaurant, although beer was still being made in the basement, and later it housed a brothel until 1953.

The Inn is the oldest commercial building in the city.  Its tin ceiling dates to 1890 and the oak bar is also over a century old.  The Inn has operated under its current name since 1963. It has hosted many legendary blues performers during that time, and is now one of the most prominent blues venues in the region.

References

Notes

External links

Blues venues
Restaurants in Indianapolis
Underground Railroad locations
Restaurants established in 1850
National Register of Historic Places in Indianapolis
Commercial buildings on the National Register of Historic Places in Indiana
Restaurants on the National Register of Historic Places